Blank Canvas: My So-Called Artist's Journey, known in Japan as , is an autobiographical  manga series written and illustrated by Akiko Higashimura. It was serialized in Shueisha's monthly manga magazine Cocohana from 2011 to 2015 and collected in five  volumes. The series is licensed in English by Seven Seas Entertainment.

Publication
The individual chapters, referred to as "canvases", were serialized in Cocohana magazine between the inaugural January 2012 issue (sold on November 28, 2011) and the March 2015 issue (sold on January 28, 2015). They were later published by Shueisha in five  volumes. The third, fourth, and fifth volumes also included bonus "sketchbook" chapters.

Reception
The series was number five on the 2013 and 2014  Top 20 Manga for Female Readers surveys and number seven on the 2015 survey. It was number four in the 2013 Comic Natalie Grand Prize. In 2015, it won the eighth Manga Taishō Award, and was awarded the grand prize in the manga division by Japan's Agency for Cultural Affairs at the 19th Japan Media Arts Festival.

Volume 2 sold 49,232 copies as of June 2013 and volume 3 sold 47,446 copies as of February 2014.

References

External links
 

Art in anime and manga
Autobiographical anime and manga
Josei manga
Manga creation in anime and manga
Manga Taishō
Seven Seas Entertainment titles
Shueisha manga